The National Research Council Canada (NRC) is the primary national agency of the Government of Canada dedicated to science and technology research & development. It is the largest federal research & development organization in Canada.

The Minister of Innovation, Science, and Economic Development (currently, François-Philippe Champagne) is responsible for the NRC.

Mandate 
NRC is an agency of the Government of Canada, and its mandate is set out in the National Research Council Act.

Under the Act, the NRC is responsible for:
 Undertaking, assisting or promoting scientific and industrial research in fields of importance to Canada;
 Providing vital scientific and technological services to the research and industrial communities;
 Investigating standards and methods of measurement;
 Working on the standardization and certification of scientific and technical apparatus, instruments and materials used or usable by Canadian industry;
 Operating and administering any astronomical observatories established or maintained by the Government of Canada;
 Establishing, operating and maintaining a national science library; and
 Publishing and selling or otherwise distributing such scientific and technical information as the Council deems necessary.
Close to 4,000 people across Canada are employed by the NRC. In addition, the NRC also employs guest workers from universities, companies, and public and private-sector organizations.

History

Between World War I and II 
The National Research Council was established in 1916, under the pressure of World War I, to advise the government on matters of science and industrial research. In 1932, laboratories were built on Sussex Drive in Ottawa.

With the impetus of World War II, the NRC grew rapidly and for all practical purposes, became a military science and weapons research organization. It undertook a number of important projects, which included participation with the United States and United Kingdom, in the development of chemical and germ warfare agents, the explosive RDX, the proximity fuse, radar, and submarine detection techniques. A special branch, known as the Examination Unit, was involved with cryptology and the interception of enemy radio communications. According to the Canadian Security Intelligence Service website, the NRC headquarters in Ottawa "was a prime espionage target" during the Cold War. The NRC was also engaged in atomic fission research at the Montreal Laboratory, and later the Chalk River Laboratories in Ontario.

Post-World War II 
Post-WWII, the NRC reverted to its pre-war civilian role, and a number of wartime activities were spun off to newly formed organizations. Military research continued under a new organization, the Defence Research Board, while inventions with commercial potential were transferred to the newly formed Canadian Patents and Development Limited; and atomic research went to the newly created Atomic Energy of Canada Limited. Foreign signals intelligence gathering officially remained with the agency when, by Order in Council, the Examination Unit became the Communications Branch of the NRC in 1946. The CBNRC was transferred to the Department of National Defence in 1975, and renamed the Communications Security Establishment. During the 1950s, the medical research funding activities of the NRC were handed over to the newly formed Medical Research Council of Canada.

Finally, on 1 May 1978, with the rapid post-war growth of Canadian universities, the NRC's role in university research funding in the natural sciences was passed under the GOSA Act to the Natural Sciences and Engineering Research Council of Canada.

Under financial pressure in the 1980s, the federal government produced what popularly became known as the Neilson Report, which recommended across-the-board financial cuts to all federal government organizations, including the NRC. This led to staff and program cutbacks.

21st Century 
In 2000, there were about 1000 NRC researchers with PhDs conducting research in many areas.

Recovery was slow, but the NRC has managed to regain its status as Canada's single most important scientific and engineering research institution among many other Canadian government scientific research organizations.

As President of the National Research Council Canada, chemist Arthur Carty revitalized the organization. In 2004, he left the NRC when then prime minister Paul Martin appointed him as independent, non-partisan advisor on science and technology.

Around June 2014, the NRC was reportedly penetrated by Chinese state-sponsored hackers.

The tenure of John McDougall as President of the NRC (2010–2016) was marked by a number of controversies. His presidency was characterized by a dramatic drop in publications and patents, by significant cuts in scientific staff, and by a 23-month period during which NRC management was aware that the organization was contaminating the water table outside its fire-safety testing facility in Mississippi Mills, Ontario, with perfluorinated chemicals used in firefighting foams and did not inform that community's inhabitants. John McDougall's departure – signalled by a sudden, three-line email to employees in March 2016 announced that he was going on personal leave. During this time Maria Aubrey, Vice President of the NRC, filled the role as Acting President. Effective August 24, 2016, Iain Stewart became the new President of the NRC. The details regarding McDougall's personal leave were not publicly disclosed.

Under Minister of Science Kirsty Duncan, the Trudeau government changed the focus of the NRC, to develop partnerships with private and public-sector technology companies, both nationally and internationally. Under the previous federal Minister of State (Science and Technology), Gary Goodyear, the NRC became in the words of one wag a "toolbox for industry" and dented basic-research infrastructure.

In August 2020 under Minister of Innovation, Science and Industry Navdeep Bains and President Iain Stewart, the NRC announced it was building the Biologics Manufacturing Centre, a facility that can produce vaccines and other biologics. The construction of the facility was started as a result of the COVID-19 pandemic, and Canada's inability to produce COVID-19 Vaccines. The facility is expected to open in July 2021, and will have a vaccine manufacturing capacity of 2 million does per month. In February 2021, the Canadian government has signed a memorandum of understanding with Novavax to pursue manufacturing its NVX-CoV2373 vaccine at the Biologics Manufacturing Centre.

In September 2020, President Iain Stewart was shuffled to the troubled Public Health Agency of Canada, and in December 2020 Bains named Mitch Davies to fill the vacancy.

In October 2021, Iain Stewart returned to his position as President of the National Research Council.

Divisions and portfolios 
Divisions of the NRC include:
 Digital Technologies
 Artificial intelligence
 Bioinformatics
 Blockchain
 Computer vision and graphics
 Cybersecurity
 Data analysis and modelling
 Human–computer interaction
 Internet of things
 Natural language processing
 Emerging Technologies
 Advanced Electronics and Photonics
 Herzberg Astronomy and Astrophysics
 Metrology
 Nanotechnology
 Security and Disruptive Technologies
 Engineering
 Construction
 Energy, Mining and Environment
 Ocean, Coastal and River Engineering
 Life Sciences
 Aquatic and Crop Resource Development
    Human Health Therapeutics
    Medical Devices
 Clinical Trial Material Facility Project
 Transportation and Manufacturing
 Aerospace
 Automotive and Surface Transportation
 Industrial Research Assistance Program
 Secretary General
 Business and Professional Services
 Corporate Services and Finance
 Biologics Manufacturing Centre (BMC) Project

Programmes 

Some areas of research & development at NRC include:
 aerospace engineering and manufacturing
 astronomy
 high-throughput DNA sequencing
 photonics
 biotechnology
 nanotechnology

At one point in January 2018 the NRC had over 30 approved programs, including the following.

Facilities 
The following are the NRC's various research centres and their areas of R&D:
 Advanced Electronics and Photonics Research Centre – semiconducting materials and photonic device design
 Aerospace Research Centre – design, manufacturing, performance and maintenance of air and space vehicles
 Aquatic and Crop Resource Development Research Centre – sustainability of foods and other bio-product sectors
 Automotive and Surface Transportation Research Centre – eco-friendly and more economical vehicles
 Canadian Campus for Advanced Materials Manufacturing (CCAMM) – a joint initiative with the Xerox Research Centre of Canada (XRCC).
 Centre for Research and Applications in Fluidic Technologies (CRAFT) – in vitro diagnostics, regenerative medicine, and precision medicine.
 Collaboration Centre for Clean Energy Transition – in partnership with the University of British Columbia
 Collaborative Unit for Translational Research – in partnership with CHU Sainte-Justine; treatment, analytics, and diagnoses for mothers and children.
 Construction Research Centre – building materials and regulations, fire safety, infrastructure and more
 Cybersecurity Collaboration Consortium – in partnership with the Canadian Institute for Cybersecurity (University of New Brunswick); cybersecurity research and its applications in security, privacy, and safety.
 Digital Technologies Research Centre – artificial intelligence, bioinformatics, blockchain, computer vision, cybersecurity, data analytics, language processing
 Energy, Mining and Environment Research Centre – reducing environmental risks and increasing "global competitiveness in the energy and mining sectors."
 Herzberg Astronomy and Astrophysics Research Centre – observatories and other astronomy and astrophysics infrastructure
 Human Health Therapeutics Research Centre – advanced therapeutics, vaccines and diagnostics technologies
 Karluk Collaboration Space – ocean engineering, technology, and science.
 Medical Devices Research Centre – medical diagnostic technology
 Metrology Research Centre – measurement research and metrological services
 Nanotechnology Research Centre – nanotechnology
 NRC-Fields Mathematical Sciences Collaboration Centre
 NRC-uOttawa Joint Centre for Extreme Photonics – in partnership with the University of Ottawa
 Ocean, Coastal and River Engineering Research Centre
 Security and Disruptive Technologies Research Centre – facilities and technical support for nanotechnologies, advanced materials, photonics and quantum technologies

Former facilities:
 Chalk River Laboratories
 Montreal Laboratory

Algal Carbon Conversion Flagship Program 
The goal of the Algal Carbon Conversion Pilot Program was to develop of an algae system to recycle carbon emissions from the oil sands. It contained plans for a $19-million facility to be constructed in Alberta, in partnership between the NRC, Canadian Natural Resources, and Pond Biofuels.

In 2008, researchers from five I-CAN organizations were developing a Carbon Algae Recycling System (CARS) to "feed waste heat and flue gas containing CO2 from industrial exhaust stacks to micro-algae growing in artificial ponds."  The "Algal Carbon Conversion", is related to prior interests of NRC President John McDougall, as he previously headed Innoventures, a company involved in lobbying for the development of an algae system to recycle carbon emissions.

The NRC was not involved in this area of research prior to the arrival of McDougall.

Canadian Wheat Improvement Flagship 
The Canadian Wheat Improvement Program is a "strategic collaboration with Agriculture and Agri-Food Canada (AAFC), the University of Saskatchewan’s Crop Development Centre and the province of Saskatchewan." With a budget of approximately $97 million (2013–2018), the Canadian Wheat Alliance will be conducting research on improving the yield of Canadian wheat crops and on the most efficient use of chemical fertilizers. Working with breeders and scientists at the Crop Development Centre and at AAFC, they will be integrating long term research with genetic improvement of wheat.

Gallium Nitride Electronics Program 
Gallium nitride (GaN) is a semiconductor commonly used in light-emitting diodes. The GaN Electronics Program supports partner research and development activities with a goal of ensuring that GaN technology will create wealth and a greener future for Canadians. The NRC is the only Canadian foundry for GaN electronics, and offers both normally-on and normally-off devices. The GaN500v2 Foundry Design Kit was released on June 28, 2014.

Industrial Research Assistance Program (NRC-IRAP) 
The NRC Industrial Research Assistance Program (NRC-IRAP) was introduced in the 1950s to support product developments in small to medium-sized businesses. The NRC provides grants and financial support to business' looking to bring new and innovative technologies to the market.

Some of the many innovations by NRC personnel included the artificial pacemaker, development of canola (rapeseed) in the 1940s, the Crash Position Indicator in the 1950s, and the Cesium Beam atomic clock in the 1960s.

Since 1974, Paul Barton of PSB Speakers used the NRC's world-class measurement facilities, their anechoic chamber. By the 1980s, more companies began to use this resource, develop it further, and tested their loudspeakers at the NRC. Electrical engineer, Floyd E. Toole, who worked at the NRC was at the centre of this research. By the year 2000, most companies had their own sound chambers, but Barton continued to use the NRC's facilities. In about 1990, PSB and other Canadian companies worked with the NRC on Athena to evaluate digital signal processing (DSP) for loudspeaker design.

From 2002 to 2006, John R. McDougall, who was appointed President of the NRC in 2010, was a member of the NRC-IRAP Advisory Board. In 2011, Bev Oda, the Minister of International Cooperation, and Gary Goodyear, Minister of State (Science and Technology), announced the grant recipients. These included small to medium-sized businesses, such as, Nortek Solutions a privately-owned Canadian software company. They received a $30,000 grant from the NRC to hire a young graphics design graduate to work on their "CUROS" people management software. Oasys Healthcare, a company that provides "innovative audio and video solutions for the medical marketplace" received a $13,000 NRC grant for its new technology for operating rooms. Jeffrey Ross Jewellery's product called Dimples, imprints fingerprints in silver using an innovative process and material, developed through a NRC $35,750 grant.

Flight dynamics
NRC's fleet of research and test aircraft

The NRC has a fleet of nine aircraft for their research purposes:
 Bell 412 – Advanced Systems Research Aircraft and 4-DOF simulator
 Bell 205 (205A-1) – 4-DOF simulator
 Bell 206 (206B) – Rotary trainer and advanced vision studies
 Canadair CT-133 Silver Star (Mk 3) – Vintage fighter jet
 Convair 580 – Multi-purpose flying laboratory
 Falcon 20 (Mystère 20) – Aerospace, geoscience testing and micro gravity testing
 Twin Otter (Series 200) – Atmospheric and biospheric studies, and for flight mechanics and flight systems development
 Extra 300 (300L) – studying pilot perception in a dynamic environment and trainer
 Harvard (4) – Trainer and experimental platform for avionics research
NRC's past fleet of research and test aircraft

Former aircraft include other models of the nine listed above and the following:
 C-45 – Atmospheric studies (retired in 1992)
 Bell 47 – Fly by wire and icing studies (last of 3 retired in the mid 1990s)
 Canadair North Star – Similar work as the Convair 580. (Retired 1974)
 de Havilland Canada DHC-5 Buffalo – High wing super STOL aircraft joint project with United States Air Force
 de Havilland Canada DHC-1 Chipmunk
 Beechcraft Queen Air – Retired from fleet pre 1980
Research aircraft
 NRC tailless glider

Nobel Prizes 
Several Nobel laureates have been associated with the NRC at various points of their careers, including:
 Sir Geoffrey Wilkinson, who spent his time at the NRC in the Montreal and the Chalk River laboratories (1942–1946)
 Dudley R. Herschbach, formerly an NRC visiting student, Nobel Prize in Chemistry
 John Polanyi, formerly an NRC postdoctoral Fellow, Nobel Prize in Chemistry
 Rudolph A. Marcus, formerly an NRC postdoctoral Fellow, Nobel Prize in Chemistry
 Sir Harold Kroto, formerly an NRC postdoctoral Fellow, Nobel Prize in Chemistry
 Bertram Brockhouse, who conducted atomic research at Chalk River from 1950 to 1952, and worked at the NRC laboratories in Ottawa (1944–1947)
 Sir John Pople, Nobel Prize in Chemistry
 Sir John Cockcroft, Nobel Prize in Physics
 Gerhard Herzberg, formerly a Director of the Division of Pure Physics, Nobel Prize in Chemistry
 Donna Strickland, formerly a Research Associate, Nobel Prize in Physics

Controversies

Harper government 
Under the tenure of Prime Minister Stephen Harper, Canadian Government research organizations began to restrict the ability of government scientists to communicate with the public. This includes restricting scientists within the NRC to communicate with the public through non-scientist communications personnel. Harper's focus as an economist was on his action plan: creating jobs and building the economy. There were widespread concerns that the progress in development was at the cost of the environment.

In 2012, the federal government moved "to defund government research centres in the High Arctic." In the same year National Research Council environmental scientists "were barred from discussing their work on snowfall with the media.

The appointment by Harper's Minister of State (Science and Technology) Gary Goodyear of John McDougall as President of the NRC was followed by several controversies:

In 2011, President John McDougall began to oversee a change in research focus away from basic research and towards industry-relevant research. This included the development of multiple programs which shifted the research budget out of existing projects and into a number of focused programs.

The transformation of the NRC into a research and technology organization that focuses on "business-led research" was part of the Harper government's Economic Action Plan. On 7 May 2013, the NRC launched its new "business approach" in which it offered four business lines: strategic research and development, technical services, management of science and technology infrastructure and NRC-Industrial Research Assistance Program (IRAP). With these services, the NRC intended to shorten the gap between early stage research and development and commercialization.

During his tenure as president, there was a drop in research publications and new patents from the NRC as the scientific staff was cut significantly. An article published in April 2016 and based on information from the office of the Minister of Science gave the following figures for the period 2011–2015: In the five years from 2011 through 2015, the number of studies in academic journals were 1,889, 1,650, 1,204, 1,017 and 549, respectively. (Figures from 2010 and earlier are generally in the 1,200 to 1,300 range.) The number of patents over the period 2011 to 2014 (with no figure available for 2015) are: 205, 251, 128 and 112, respectively. The years before 2011 averaged 250 to 300 patents per year. In September 2016, the office of the Minister of Science released figures showing that from 2010 to 2015, the number of research officers at the NRC fell by 26 per cent, and the number of scientists and engineers of all kinds fell by 22 per cent.

McDougall's tenure as president included the period during which the NRC contaminated the water table in the Eastern Ontario community of Mississippi Mills, without informing its inhabitants. In January 2014, NRC employees at the fire-safety testing facility in Mississippi Mills were told to start drinking bottled water. In December 2015, 23 months later, residents of Mississippi Mills with homes near the facility were warned by the NRC that their well-water was contaminated with toxic chemicals called perfluorinated alkyl substances, often found in firefighting foam. In July 2016, Acting President Maria Aubrey formally acknowledged that the NRC's National Fire Laboratory was the source of the groundwater contamination in Mississippi Mills. In December 2016, it was reported that owners of homes near the lab in Mississippi Mills were launching a multi-million dollar lawsuit against the NRC over water contamination.

In March 2016, John McDougall sent a three-sentence email to NRC employees, announcing that he was going on personal leave. Subsequently, NRC management announced that two major projects he had led would be abandoned: re-branding the NRC as "CNRCSolutions" – though colourful "CNRCSolutions" T-shirts and "branding books" had already been distributed, and re-organizing its three research divisions into five research divisions.

Effective August 24, 2016 under Kirsty Duncan, Iain Stewart became the new President of the NRC. The details regarding McDougall's personal leave were not publicly disclosed.

Bill C-38 
Bill C-38 angered many people who opposed unregulated industrial growth. They argued that science was being gutted and silenced to open the way for development in ecologically sensitive areas in the north.

In June 2012, the federal opposition made a motion in parliament,

Thirty Meter Telescope
Thirty Meter Telescope (TMT) is a proposed extremely large telescope (ELT) that has become controversial due to its planned location on Mauna Kea, which is considered sacred land according to the native Hawaiians, on the island of Hawaii in the United States. On April 6, 2015, Prime Minister Stephen Harper announced that Canada would commit $243.5 million over a period of 10 years. The telescope's enclosure was designed by Dynamic Structures Ltd. in British Columbia.

In an online petition, a group of Canadian academics have called on Prime Minister Justin Trudeau, together with Navdeep Bains (then Minister of Innovation, Science and Economic Development) and Kirsty Duncan (then Minister Of Science) to divest Canadian funding from the project. On July 20, 2019, an online petition titled "A Call to Divest Canada's Research Funding for the Thirty Meter Telescope on Mauna Kea" has been posted on Change.org.

Agencies with special relationships with the NRC 
Specialized agencies and services which have branched out of the NRC include:
 Canadian Space Agency
 Defence Research and Development Canada
 Atomic Energy of Canada Limited
 Canadian Institutes of Health Research
 Communications Security Establishment
 Natural Sciences and Engineering Research Council

See also
 National Research Council Time Signal
 Canadian government scientific research organizations
 Canadian university scientific research organizations
 Canadian industrial research and development organizations
 List of presidents of the National Research Council of Canada
 Science and technology in Canada
 Herbert Yardley – American cryptologist who help establish the Examination Unit in 1941
 William Arthur Steel – headed radio laboratory at the NRC in the 1930s
 List of aerospace flight test centres
 NRC Research Press

Notes

References

External links

 
 Archival papers held at University of Toronto Archives and Records Management Services

 
Government agencies established in 1916
Federal departments and agencies of Canada
Education in Canada
Innovation, Science and Economic Development Canada
Scientific organizations based in Canada
Science and technology in Canada
1916 establishments in Canada
Research councils
Members of the International Council for Science
Members of the International Science Council
Sussex Drive